Aulandra longifolia is a plant in the family Sapotaceae. The specific epithet longifolia means "long leaf".

Description
Its bark is greyish brown. The flowers are white to creamy.

Distribution and habitat
Aulandra longifolia is endemic to Borneo. Its habitat is mixed dipterocarp forest to  altitude.

References

longifolia
Endemic flora of Borneo
Trees of Borneo
Plants described in 1927
Flora of the Borneo lowland rain forests